Celine Sivertsen (born 20 April 1993) is a Norwegian handball player for Jeanne d'Arc Dijon Handball.

References

1993 births
Living people
Sportspeople from Bergen
Norwegian female handball players